Lucas Sebastián Nanía Machain (born January 14, 1984 in Buenos Aires, Argentina), commonly known as Lucas Nanía, is an Argentine football midfielder currently playing for Defensores de Belgrano.

Career 
He started his career playing for San Lorenzo then he was loaned to Palestino of Chile to gain experience. After a successful stint at the Chilean club, he returned to Argentina as a promising player, however he was not used by the head coach, making the midfielder transfer to Estudiantes de Mérida, of Venezuela.

After a season in the Venezuelan club, he was loaned to Deportivo Pereira, of Colombia, playing the 2007 season. Nanía was then transferred to San Martín de San Juan and after that to Ferro Carril Oeste, where he had a successful performance, staying in the club for two seasons.

In the second half of 2010, he joined Everton, where he played a few games. He then joined Vitória of Brazil to play in the 2011 season, but made no appearances at all. On July 20, 2011, Lucas joined Primera B Nacional club Independiente Rivadavia.

References

External links

1984 births
Living people
Argentine footballers
Argentine expatriate footballers
San Lorenzo de Almagro footballers
Club Deportivo Palestino footballers
Estudiantes de Mérida players
Deportivo Pereira footballers
San Martín de San Juan footballers
Ferro Carril Oeste footballers
Everton de Viña del Mar footballers
Esporte Clube Vitória players
Club Atlético Huracán footballers
Independiente Rivadavia footballers
Apollon Smyrnis F.C. players
Deportivo Morón footballers
Argentine Primera División players
Primera Nacional players
Categoría Primera A players
Football League (Greece) players
Expatriate footballers in Brazil
Expatriate footballers in Chile
Expatriate footballers in Colombia
Expatriate footballers in Venezuela
Expatriate footballers in Greece
Association football midfielders
Footballers from Buenos Aires